The 2004 Southland Conference men's basketball tournament took place March 8–12, 2004. The quarterfinal and semifinal rounds were played at the home arena of the higher seeded-teams, with the championship game played at Convocation Center in San Antonio, Texas.

Third-seeded  won the championship game over fourth-seeded , and earned the conference's automatic bid to the NCAA tournament. LeRoy Hurd of Texas–San Antonio was named the tournament's MVP.

Format
The top eight eligible men's basketball teams in the Southland Conference received a berth in the conference tournament.  After the conference season, teams were seeded by conference record. For the semifinal round, the remaining teams were reseeded.

Bracket

References

Tournament
Southland Conference men's basketball tournament
Southland Conference men's basketball tournament
Southland Conference men's basketball tournament